Walter Lambertus (14 August 1955 – 21 March 2019) was a Romanian rower. He competed in the men's single sculls event at the 1976 Summer Olympics. Lambertus sought asylum in Canada during the 1976 Summer Olympics.

References

1955 births
2019 deaths
Romanian male rowers
Olympic rowers of Romania
Rowers at the 1976 Summer Olympics
Place of birth missing